Timo Karppinen (born 26 December 1967) is a Finnish orienteering competitor. He received five medals in the World Orienteering Championships between 1993 and 1997.

See also
 Finnish orienteers
 List of orienteers
 List of orienteering events

References

External links
 
 

1967 births
Living people
Finnish orienteers
Male orienteers
Foot orienteers
World Orienteering Championships medalists